Vermiglio is a surname. Notable people with the surname include:

Giuseppe Vermiglio ( 1585–1635), Italian Baroque painter
Pietro Martire Vermiglio (1499–1562), Italian theologian
Valerio Vermiglio (born 1976), Italian volleyball player